, also known as I Give My All, is a Japanese erotic comedy manga series written and illustrated by Hikaru Yuzuki. It was serialized in Shueisha's seinen manga magazine Weekly Young Jump from 1982 to 1987, with its chapters collected in 19 tankōbon volumes. It was adapted into a live action film in 1985. An original video animation (OVA) and a television special were released in 1987. The OVA was planned to be released in North America by Central Park Media in 1991, but it was canceled due to negative publicity.

Media

Manga
Written and illustrated by Hikaru Yuzuki, Minna Agechau was serialized in Shueisha's seinen manga magazine Weekly Young Jump from 1982 to 1987. Shueisha collected its chapters in 19 tankōbon volumes, released from July 25, 1983, to October 25, 1987.

Live-action films
A live-action film adaptation directed by Shusuke Kaneko premiered on April 20, 1985. The film won the ninth Best Film of the year award at the seventh Yokohama Film Festival.

A television special aired on June 22, 1987.

Original video animation
A 45-minute original video animation (OVA) adaptation, directed by Osamu Uemura and animated by J.C.Staff, was released on March 28, 1987.

The OVA was planned to be released in North America by Central Park Media in 1991; however, it was canceled due to negative publicity.

See also
 Amai Seikatsu, another manga series by the same author

References

External links 
 
 
 

Animated films based on manga
Films directed by Shusuke Kaneko
Japanese sex comedy films
Japanese television dramas based on manga
Japanese television specials
1980s Japanese-language films
J.C.Staff
Seinen manga
Sex comedy anime and manga
Shueisha manga
Shueisha franchises